England's Economic Heartland Strategic Alliance is one of seven sub-national transport bodies in England. EEH is a partnership of councils and local enterprise partnerships, stretching from Swindon and Oxfordshire in the west to Cambridgeshire in the east, and from Northamptonshire down to Hertfordshire. The area includes the Oxford-Cambridge Arc, as defined by Government.

About 
England's Economic Heartland Strategic Alliance was founded in November 2015.

It is currently chaired by Cllr Martin Tett, leader of Buckinghamshire County Council. The vice-chairman is Cllr James Jamieson, leader of Central Bedfordshire Council. Mayor of Bedford Borough, Dave Hodgson, chairs the Strategic Transport Forum.

Constituent members 

 Oxfordshire County Council
 Swindon Borough Council
 Northamptonshire County Council
 Buckinghamshire Council
 Milton Keynes Council
 Bedford Borough Council
 Central Bedfordshire Council
 Luton Borough Council
 Hertfordshire County Council
 Cambridgeshire County Council
 Peterborough City Council
 Oxfordshire Local Enterprise Partnership
 Buckinghamshire Thames Valley Local Enterprise Partnership   
 South East Midlands Local Enterprise Partnership
 Hertfordshire Local Enterprise Partnership
 Swindon and Wiltshire Local Enterprise Partnership

National Infrastructure Commission report 

In its November 2017 the National Infrastructure Commission (NIC) released a report calling on the Oxford-Milton Keynes-Cambridge 'arc' to be made a 'national priority', with investment in major transport schemes.

The NIC's report, Partnering for Prosperity, said England's Economic Heartland had gained 'recognition at national level', and 'received
financial backing from the Department for Transport to advance an ambitious programme of work, including the development of an overarching transport strategy and work to identify and define a major road network across the arc'.

Sub-national Transport Body status 
In summer 2017, England's Economic Heartland consulted on becoming a Sub-national Transport Body (STB).

The Department for Transport's Transport Investment Strategy, states that STBs will be involved in infrastructure decision-making.

They will advise on investment on the new Major Road Network.

Transport Strategy 
England's Economic Heartland is producing a Transport Strategy for the region which will guide decisions about investment and priorities up to 2050. A draft version for consultation is due to be published in summer 2020. In summer 2019 England's Economic Heartland held a period of engagement on its Outline Transport Strategy.

See also
 Cambridge - Milton Keynes - Oxford corridor

References 

Strategic alliances
Transport in England
United Kingdom industrial planning policy
Sub-national transport bodies